Power Rangers is an entertainment and merchandising franchise.

Power Rangers may also refer to:

 Power Rangers or Mighty Morphin Power Rangers (1993–1995 TV series)
 "Power Rangers" (song) (1994)
 Mighty Morphin Power Rangers: The Movie (1995)
 Power Rangers (film), a 2017 feature film reboot of the series
 Power Rangers (comics)
 Power Rangers (Boom! Studios) (2016–present)
 The South Korean name for Super Sentai
 Power/Rangers, a 2015 fan film based on the franchise

See also